Rex Maynard Linn (born November 13, 1956) is an American film and television actor. He is best known domestically for playing the role of Sgt. Frank Tripp in the CBS drama CSI: Miami and more recently for playing Kevin Wachtell in the television series Better Call Saul. Internationally he is best known for playing Richard Travers in the 1993 action thriller film Cliffhanger.

Early life and education
Linn was born in Spearman, Texas, the third child, and second son, of Darlene (née Deere) and James Paul Linn. In August 1969, his parents relocated the family to Oklahoma City, Oklahoma, where his father practiced law. There he attended Heritage Hall and later Casady School, an independent school affiliated with the Episcopal Church, and was employed part-time at the Oklahoma City Zoo. November 1975, after seeing Jack Nicholson in One Flew Over the Cuckoo's Nest, Linn announced he was an actor.

In his high-school production of Fiddler on the Roof, after Linn demolished a set during a number, his drama coach ordered him off the set and advised him to direct his energy to some other field of endeavor, ending Linn's high-school acting career. He graduated from Oklahoma State University in 1980.

Career
After graduation, Linn worked his way up to vice president  of energy lending for the Lakeshore Bank, remaining with it until July 5, 1982, when the bank went insolvent. Linn was able to persuade a talent agent to take a chance on him and represent him in the Oklahoma market. At the same time, he accepted a job with an oil company, overseeing field operations in western Oklahoma, all the while auditioning for film and TV commercial parts. After shooting some commercials, he started landing small roles in various projects. During this time, he was given the opportunity to act in his first film, Dark Before Dawn, which was being produced by his best friend, Edward K. Gaylord II.

In 1989, he was cast in his first substantial role, as serial killer Floyd Epps, in Night Game, starring Roy Scheider. Following this film, and a part as the sheriff in a 1990 episode of The Young Riders (titled "Hard Time"), he decided it was time to head west. He began with small roles in theatrical films such as My Heroes Have Always Been Cowboys (1991), Thunderheart (1992), Sniper (1993), and Cliffhanger (1993), and guest shots on TV series including Northern Exposure, Raven, and The Adventures of Brisco County, Jr.. Since Cliffhanger, he has appeared in more than 35 films, with that number growing annually. Linn's most recent movie credit is in the political thriller, An Acceptable Loss (2018), where he starred alongside Jamie Lee Curtis.

On June 29, 1994, Linn was honored with a star on Carpenter's Square Theatre Walk of Fame in Oklahoma City. In 1994, he played a detective in Clear and Present Danger. He was a celebrity co-host of the Oklahoma Film Society Real to Reel 2005: "Classic Monster Mash". He has narrated three audio books, One Ranger (2005), A Man Called Cash (2005), and Missing Persons (2006), as well as a documentary for the Oklahoma University InvestEd program, Anatomy of Fraud – Catching a Con in Pottawatomie County in 2004. A similar documentary, Anatomy of a Fraud: Catching a Con in Logan County, also to be narrated by Linn, was described as being "in production" in 2005.

He currently is reported to be living in Sherman Oaks, California, with his dogs, Jack and Choctaw. Linn is a University of Texas Longhorns fan, even taking the day off from his CSI: Miami work to attend the 2005 Rose Bowl game when his beloved team played and won the 2005 national championship against the University of Southern California.

He is a former chairman of the Oklahoma City chapter of Ducks Unlimited. In 1986, he won the state duck-calling competition, and came fourth in the national competition.

Linn is an active supporter of children's charities and the arts. On May 12, 2007, he was a celebrity award presenter at the National Association of Police Organizations TOP COPS award ceremony in Washington, DC.

He had recurring roles in several TV series, most recently as Sgt. Frank Tripp on CSI: Miami, a role for which he was tricked into reading during the first season and which he held, as a series regular, until the end of the series.

He had a minor role in the webisode series The Walking Dead: Torn Apart playing as Mike Palmer, a father hiding in a neighborhood in Georgia during a zombie apocalypse. It aired on AMC.com on October 3, 2011.

Personal life
Linn has been dating country singer Reba McEntire since late 2020.

Filmography

Film

Television

References

External links
 
 
 Rex Linn Bio at CBS - CSI: Miami
 Interview with TheStarScoop.com, November 2006

1956 births
American male film actors
American male television actors
American people of Dutch descent
American people of English descent
American people of German descent
American people of Norwegian descent
Living people
Male actors from Texas
Male actors from Oklahoma City
Oklahoma State University alumni
People from Hansford County, Texas
20th-century American male actors
21st-century American male actors